Tena Negere (born 5 October 1972) is a retired long-distance runner from Ethiopia, who won the gold medal in the men's marathon at the 1991 All-Africa Games in Cairo, Egypt. He also triumphed in the 1992 edition of the Fukuoka Marathon, clocking 2:09:04 on 6 December 1992. The next year he finished in 34th place (2:29:46) at the 1993 World Championships. He also competed in the men's marathon at the 1992 Summer Olympics.

Achievements

References

External links
 1992 Year Ranking

1972 births
Living people
Ethiopian male long-distance runners
Ethiopian male marathon runners
Place of birth missing (living people)
World Athletics Championships athletes for Ethiopia
African Games gold medalists for Ethiopia
African Games medalists in athletics (track and field)
Olympic athletes of Ethiopia
Athletes (track and field) at the 1992 Summer Olympics
Athletes (track and field) at the 1991 All-Africa Games
20th-century Ethiopian people
21st-century Ethiopian people